is a Japanese rugby sevens player. She was a member of the Japan women's national rugby sevens team at the 2016 Summer Olympics. She won a silver medal at the 2014 Asian Games in rugby sevens.

References

External links 
 
 

1992 births
Living people
People from Kanagawa Prefecture
Sportspeople from Kanagawa Prefecture
Olympic rugby sevens players of Japan
Japanese rugby sevens players
Japan international women's rugby sevens players
Rugby sevens players at the 2016 Summer Olympics
Rugby union players at the 2014 Asian Games
Rugby union players at the 2018 Asian Games
Asian Games gold medalists for Japan
Asian Games silver medalists for Japan
Asian Games medalists in rugby union
Medalists at the 2014 Asian Games
Medalists at the 2018 Asian Games